Miguel Silva may refer to
Miguel Silva (footballer, born April 1995), Portuguese footballer 
Miguel Silva (footballer, born December 1995), Portuguese footballer
Miguel Silva (Venezuelan footballer) (born 2000), Venezuelan footballer